Pelou (Pɛ̀:lú) is a village and rural commune in the Cercle of Bandiagara of the Mopti Region of Mali. The commune contains four villages and in the 2009 census had a population of 4,348.

The village is situated on a rocky plateau. Farming, gardening, and herding are the main economic activities. Donno So is spoken in Pelou. The local surname is Tembély.

References

External links
.
.

Communes of Mopti Region